Nick Brune (born 29 March 1952), is a Canadian educator, historian, and author.

Life
Born in London, England, he received bachelor's degree and a master's degree in honours history and political science from the University of Toronto.

Brune began his teaching career in Lausanne, Switzerland but has taught most of his career in Halton County.
He currently teaches history and civics at Iroquois Ridge High School, Oakville, Ontario, Canada.

Brune is currently the president of the non-profit educational foundation, the Civics Channel, dedicated to research, teaching and learning in the areas of citizenship and society, politics, human rights, and the justice system.

Publications
Brune has co-authored more than half a dozen history and civics textbooks, beginning with Canada:  A North American Nation (McGraw-Hill Ryerson, 1989) and most recently Defining Canada:  History, Identity, and Culture (McGraw-Hill Ryerson, 2003).   He is co-author and producer of the Civics Canada Online Textbook, as well as its print version, Civics Canada.

In addition, he has produced learning resources for a variety of different organizations. He helped found and was the Educational Writer for the award-winning CBC-TV News in Review for its first six years of existence. He has written a number of resources for The Dominion Institute (Our Heroes, The Memory Project, Passages to Canada, and The Democracy Project. For the Hong Kong Commemorative Veterans Association, he wrote Canada in Hong Kong, 1941–1945, The Forgotten Heroes. Working with ALPHA, he co-authored a learning resource that examines human rights abuses in China, 1931–1945.

Brune has given presentations in Canada (Victoria, Winnipeg, Toronto, Montreal, and Halifax) and beyond (Birmingham, UK, Seoul, South Korea, and Shanghai, China). His themes have included historical as well as pedagogical topics.

Awards
Nick Brune has received the Marshall McLuhan Distinguished Teacher Award (1992) and the Governor General's Award for Excellence in Teaching Canadian History (2002).
He is also co-author and producer of History of Canada Online (HCO), as well as its textbook version, Canada: Our Story, Our People.  .

References

External links
Nick Brune Home Pages
The Civics Channel The Civics Channel

20th-century Canadian historians
Canadian male non-fiction writers
Historians of Canada
University of Toronto alumni
People from Oakville, Ontario
1952 births
Living people
21st-century Canadian historians